Philo is a census-designated place in Mendocino County, California, United States. The population was 319 at the 2020 census.

Philo is located in Anderson Valley in western Mendocino County. Situated along Indian Creek as it flows into the Navarro River, Philo is the home of KZYX, the local public radio station. Two small specialty lumber mills in Philo are all that remain of a once vigorous timber economy in Anderson Valley. Philo is the heart of the Anderson Valley wine region. 

The first post office opened in 1888. The ZIP Code is 95466. The community is inside area code 707.

Two versions of how Philo was named are current: first, that its founder Cornelius Prather named it after his favorite female cousin; second, that he named it for his former home at Philo, Illinois.

Geography
Philo is located at geographical coordinates 39° 3′ 57″ North, 123° 26′ 42″ West. California State Route 128 leads southeast (up the valley)  to Boonville and northwest (downriver)  to State Route 1 near Navarro Beach on the Pacific Ocean.

Demographics
The 2010 United States Census reported that Philo had a population of 349. The racial makeup of Philo was 171 (49.0%) White, 2 (0.6%) African American, 4 (1.1%) Native American, 5 (1.4%) Asian, 0 (0.0%) Pacific Islander, 157 (45.0%) from other races, and 10 (2.9%) from two or more races. Hispanic or Latino of any race were 204 persons (58.5%).

The Census reported that 329 people (94.3% of the population) lived in households, 5 (1.4%) lived in non-institutionalized group quarters, and 15 (4.3%) were institutionalized.

There were 98 households, out of which 47 (48.0%) had children under the age of 18 living in them, 37 (37.8%) were opposite-sex married couples living together, 12 (12.2%) had a female householder with no husband present, 17 (17.3%) had a male householder with no wife present. There were 13 (13.3%) unmarried opposite-sex partnerships, and 2 (2.0%) same-sex married couples or partnerships. 24 households (24.5%) were made up of individuals, and 9 (9.2%) had someone living alone who was 65 years of age or older. The average household size was 3.36. There were 66 families (67.3% of all households); the average family size was 3.64.

The population was spread out, with 113 people (32.4%) under the age of 18, 37 people (10.6%) aged 18 to 24, 86 people (24.6%) aged 25 to 44, 81 people (23.2%) aged 45 to 64, and 32 people (9.2%) who were 65 years of age or older. The median age was 30.4 years. For every 100 females, there were 118.1 males. For every 100 females age 18 and over, there were 122.6 males.

The homeowner vacancy rate was 0%; the rental vacancy rate was 1.5%. 104 people (29.8% of the population) lived in owner-occupied housing units and 225 people (64.5%) lived in rental housing units.

Education
Students in Philo attend Anderson Valley Elementary School and Anderson Valley Junior-Senior High School. Both are located in Boonville.

Notable residents 
Bernice Bing, artist
Swami Tripurari, author, poet, and guru

Politics

See also
Lazy Creek Vineyards

Notes and references

Census-designated places in Mendocino County, California
Census-designated places in California